"Which Way Do I Go (Now That I'm Gone)" is a song recorded by American country music artist Waylon Jennings.  It was released in January 1989 as the second single from the album Full Circle.  The song reached #28 on the Billboard Hot Country Singles & Tracks chart.  The song was written by Johnny MacRae and Steve Clark.

Chart performance

References

1989 singles
1988 songs
Waylon Jennings songs
Songs written by Johnny MacRae
Song recordings produced by Jimmy Bowen
MCA Records singles